G.A.R. Memorial Hall is a historic multi-purpose community hall located at Hunt in Livingston County, New York. It was built about 1880 as home to the local chapter of the Grand Army of the Republic.  It is a 1-story, three-by-three-bay brick structure with a gable roof.

It was listed on the National Register of Historic Places in 2006.

References

Clubhouses on the National Register of Historic Places in New York (state)
Buildings and structures in Livingston County, New York
National Register of Historic Places in Livingston County, New York